Parotocinclus spilosoma is a species of catfish in the family Loricariidae. It is native to South America, where it occurs in the state of Paraíba in Brazil. The species reaches 6 cm (2.4 inches) in total length.

References 

Loricariidae
Otothyrinae
Fish described in 1941